St Mary's Church is in the West Bank area of Widnes, Cheshire, England. The church is recorded in the National Heritage List for England as a designated Grade II* listed building. It is an active Anglican parish church in the diocese of Liverpool, the archdeaconry of Warrington and the deanery of Widnes. Together with the churches of St Paul, Widnes, and St Mary, Hale, it forms the South Widnes Team. It has been described as "the last great church masterpiece" created by the Lancaster architects Austin and Paley.

History
The first church in West Bank, known as Widnes Dock Church and dedicated to St Mary, was opened in 1858. This church was never completed and consisted only of the nave. It had been built on chemical waste which subsided, leading to bulging of the walls and twisting of the roof. In the early 1900s a new site was obtained near the promenade, and money was raised for a new church. The foundation stone was laid on 14 May 1908 and the church was opened on 12 November 1910. The church was designed by Austin and Paley, cost £16,669 in total (equivalent to £ in ), which included £5,400 for the site, and provided seating for 770 people.

Architecture

Exterior
The church is built in red flecked sandstone, and the nave roof is in Ruabon tiles. The aisle roofs are in lead. Its plan consists of a five-bay nave with a clerestory, north and south aisles which embrace a west tower, and north and south transepts, a chancel. The northwest porch is set at an angle to the church and the south porch is perpendicular to it. The church is built in Perpendicular style. The north transept is in one bay and includes the organ. The south transept is in three bays and forms a Lady chapel. The tower has a projecting octagonal staircase on the southeast corner and buttresses on the southeast corner. An inscribed frieze of the Te Deum runs around the tower and below the parapet of the south and east sides of the church.

Interior
The furnishings are of oak and were designed by the architects. The font is made of Darley Dale stone. The stained glass in the east window depicts the Ascension and an Apocalyptic Vision and was designed by Shrigley and Hunt.  The three-manual organ was built by Wm. Hill and Son in 1902 and restored and enlarged between 1936 and 1947 by Henry Willis & Sons.

External features

An octagonal wayside pulpit is set into the boundary wall of the church. Also designed by Austin and Paley, it is constructed in red sandstone and approached by six steps. The text "Go out into the highways and compel them to come in that my house may be filled" (from ) is cut into its masonry. It is listed at Grade II.

See also

Grade I and II* listed buildings in Halton (borough)
Listed buildings in Widnes
List of ecclesiastical works by Austin and Paley (1895–1914)

References
Notes

Citations

Sources

External links
St. Mary's on YouTube
St. Mary's on Twitter
St. Mary's on Facebook
St. Mary's on A Church Near You

Church of England church buildings in Cheshire
Grade II* listed churches in Cheshire
Churches completed in 1910
20th-century Church of England church buildings
Gothic Revival church buildings in England
Gothic Revival architecture in Cheshire
Austin and Paley buildings
Buildings and structures in Widnes
Anglican Diocese of Liverpool